In 2022, characters from the Mr. Men and Little Miss book and television series became a viral internet meme with users on social media platforms posting them to reveal aspects of their own personalities in a humorous way.

According to Mashable, the meme can be traced back to 2014. However, the meme became viral when @juulpuppy, an Instagram meme generator, began posting them in 2022. The first memes posted by @juulpuppy received 52,000 likes on Instagram. Social media users post an image of a character from the series along with a personality trait they have. When describing the memes, Forbes India said "these 2022 reboots are being used to highlight darker, more toxic sides of people's personalities and attitudes—although always with humor" and connected them to the trend of presenting trauma as humor. The memes are also used to present insecurities.

References

Internet memes introduced in 2014
Little Miss series
Mr. Men series